"Help Me Dr. Dick" is a song recorded by German Eurodance project E-Rotic. It was released on January 10, 1996 as the second single from their second album, The Power of Sex (1996). The single reached number 23 in Germany and was also a hit in Austria, Denmark, Finland and Hungary, where it reached number 18, five and three, respectively.

Music video
An animated music video for "Help Me Dr. Dick" was directed by Zoran Bihać and produced at Studio Film Bilder GmbH. It depicts a female patient undergoing breast augmentation from the eponymous Dr. Dick, who is also shown performing surgery on several other patients. After receiving anesthesia, the female patient dreams of being rescued by Dr. Dick in various situations. At the end of the video, the woman is awakened from her surgery, but discovers that Dr. Dick mistakenly augmented her arms and gave the breast augmentation to a nearby male patient.

Track listings
 CD maxi - Europe
 "Help Me Dr. Dick" (Radio Edit) - 3:42
 "Help Me Dr. Dick" (Extended Version) - 5:43
 "Help Me Dr. Dick" (Club Version) - 4:57
 "Help Me Dr. Dick" (Instrumental Version) - 3:42

 CD maxi - European Remixes
 "Help Me Dr. Dick" (The First Aid Remix) - 5:57
 "Help Me Dr. Dick" (Dr.'s Hospital Remix) - 5:05
 "Help Me Dr. Dick" (The Emergency Remix) - 7:09

Credits
 Written by: David Brandes, John O'Flynn
 Composed by: David Brandes, John O'Flynn
 Arranged by: Domenico Livrano, Felix J. Gauder and David Brandes, at Bros Studios / Rüssmann Studios / Why Headroom
 Produced by: David Brandes, Felix J. Gauder, John O'Flynn
 Published by: Cosima Music

Charts

References

1996 singles
1996 songs
Animated music videos
Blow Up singles
English-language German songs
E-Rotic songs
EMI Music France singles
Songs written by David Brandes
Songs written by Bernd Meinunger